Marazanvose is a hamlet southwest of Zelah in Cornwall, England. It is on the A30 main road.

References

Hamlets in Cornwall